Empress Yang may refer to:

Empress Yang Yan  (238–274), empress of the Jin Dynasty
Empress Yang Zhi  (259–292), empress of the Jin Dynasty and Yang Yan's cousin.
Yang Xianrong (died 322), empress of Emperor Hui of Jin and Liu Yao of Han Zhao in ancient China
Empress Yang (Former Qin) (died 386), empress of the Chinese/Di state Former Qin
Empress Yang (Lü Zuan's wife) (died 401), empress of the Chinese/Di state Later Liang
Empress Yang (Lü Long's wife), empress of the Chinese/Di state Later Liang
Yang Lihua  (561–609), empress of the Chinese/Xianbei dynasty Northern Zhou
Empress Yang (Song Dynasty) (1162–1232), wife of Emperor Ningzong of Song

See also
Consort Yang (disambiguation)

Yang